The former US Post Office is a historic post office building located at Smithfield, Johnston County, North Carolina.  It was designed by the Office of the Supervising Architect and built in 1936 by the Works Progress Administration. It is a two-story, five bay, rectangular brick building in the Colonial Revival style. It consists of three distinct sections: the two-story front block; a one-story rectangular center block; and a two-level rear block. The front facade features fluted Ionic order pilasters rising to a frieze supporting a broken pediment.  The building housed federal government offices until 1990.  The building was renovated in 1991 to house law offices.

It was listed on the National Register of Historic Places in 1993.

References

Buildings and structures in Smithfield, North Carolina
Colonial architecture in North Carolina
Government buildings completed in 1936
National Register of Historic Places in Johnston County, North Carolina
Smithfield
Works Progress Administration in North Carolina